Christopher Thomas Tower (1775 – 19 February 1867) was an English landowner.

Biography
The son of Christopher Tower of Weald Hall, Essex, and grandson of Christopher Tower MP, he succeeded his father in 1810. In 1832 he was elected to Parliament for Harwich, sitting as a moderate Whig. He did not contest the 1835 general election and was unsuccessful in his attempt to be re-elected in 1837. His son Christopher was also an MP.

References
 Michael Stenton ed., Who's Who of British Members of Parliament (1976) vol. I, p. 381.

1775 births
1867 deaths
Politicians from Essex
UK MPs 1832–1835
Whig (British political party) MPs for English constituencies